Kadhaprasangam (lyrical narrative or story telling performance) is a performing art of Kerala, India.

Performance 
It combines speaking, acting, and singing to present a story. Costumes, make-up, or settings are not used. The main artist, the Kaadhikan, tells the story, acts and sings with two or three accompanying instrumentalists. A performance typically lasts  to 3 hours.

History 

It originated from an earlier art form Harikathakalakshepam which used similar techniques, but differed in theme and style. While Harikadhakalakshepam was based on themes from puranas and epics, Kadhaprasangam received themes largely from classical and popular literature. 

Kadhaprasangam's heyday was in the second half of 20th century, attracting crowds on temple grounds in the festival season. It spread beyond temple grounds as a popular presentation viz. 'Kadhaprasangam' by Swami Sathyadevan. The Govt of India honoured Swami Sathyadevan with a pension awarded to founders of art forms while the Swami was in Banaras in 1961. 

Its chief and later exponents were Swami Brahmavruthan,  M. P. Manmadhan, K. K. Vadhyar, P. C. Abraham, Joseph Kaimaparamban , V. Sambasivan, Kedamangalam Sadanandan, Kadavoor Balan,Dr. Kadavoor Sivadasan, Ayisha Beevi,  Kollam Babu, Mavelikara S.S.Unnithan, V. Harsha Kumar, Kallada V. V. Kutty, Paravur Sukumaran, V. D. Rajappan, Vatakara V Asokan, Dr. Vasanthakumar Sambasivan, Nadakkal Ashokkumar,V V Jose Kallada, Gopika Vazhuthacaud and others. They contributed to Kerala's social and educational renaissance. Nadakkal Ashokkumar performed Kadhaprasangam in Temples, Cultural organisations, All India radio and Dooradarsan. He performed Shakespeare's Hamlet  and Mahabharatha stories.

Source material 
The scripts can be original works written for the performance or adaptations of stories from epics, classical, or modern literature. William Shakespeare's Othello, Leo Tolstoy's Anna Karenina, Kumaran Asan's Karuna, Vallathol Narayana Menon’s Magdalana Mariyam, Changampuzha Krishna Pillai's Ramanan, Thirunalloor Karunakaran's Rani and Vayalar Ramavarma's Aaayisha  were some of the literary classics thus successfully adapted for Kadhaprasangam.

References

External links

Arts of Kerala
Performing arts in India